Esmailabad (also Romanized as Esmā‘īlābād) is a village in Tus Rural District, in the Central District of Mashhad County, Razavi Khorasan Province, Iran. At the 2006 census, its population was 3,083, in 737 families.

References 

Populated places in Mashhad County